Munson may refer to:

Places
 Munson Township, Henry County, Illinois
 Munson Township, Stearns County, Minnesota
 Munson Township, Geauga County, Ohio
 Munson, Alberta, Canada, a village
 Munsons, Missouri, a community in the United States
 Mount Munson, Ross Dependency, Antarctica

People
 Munson (surname)
 Munson Rufus Hill (1821–1867), American lawyer, politician and Confederate colonel
 Munson Jarvis (1742–1824), a merchant and politician in New Brunswick (in what is now Canada)

Other uses
 Munson (grape)
 Munson Airport, a private airport in Lane County, Oregon
 Munson Line, an American steamship company from 1899 to 1937
 Munson Medical Center, a referral hospital in Traverse City, Michigan
 Munson Hall, a residence hall on the campus of George Washington University, Washington, DC

See also
 Munson's Hill, Fairfax County, Virginia
 Justice Munson (disambiguation)
 Munsön